Ahfachkee School, also known as Ahfachkee Day School, is a tribal K-12 school in unincorporated Hendry County, Florida, on the Big Cypress Reservation, with a Clewiston postal address. It is affiliated with the Bureau of Indian Education (BIE).

 about 80% of the funding comes from the Seminole tribe and 20% comes from the BIE.

The word "Ahfachkee" means "happy".

History
In 1970 the school had grades 1-5 and at the time it was operated by the Bureau of Indian Affairs (BIA). According to the government employees, the school was needed because the  distance to county-operated public schools in Clewiston was significant.

Curriculum and programming
The school requires its students to take cultural classes in cooking, making textiles, and in agriculture, in addition to regular academic courses.

In 1969 graduate students of Florida Atlantic University helped students create their own textbooks and collectively improve each other's English reading skills.

Operations
In 1970 students on the reservation were not required to attend school, and as a result school absenteeism was common.

Campus
In 1970 the school had a cafeteria and three classrooms.

Student body
In 1970 it had 47 students.

In 2007 it had 150 students.

Academic achievement
In 1970 Kent Pollock of the Palm Beach Post stated that the school's students had poor academic results.

References

External links
 Ahfachkee School
 Ahfachkee School Environmental Assessment - WGI Incorporated

Public K-12 schools in Florida
Education in Hendry County, Florida
Native American K-12 schools
Seminole Tribe of Florida